Victory is successful conclusion of a fight or competition.

Victory may also refer to:

Places

United States
Victory, Cayuga County, New York, a town
Victory, Saratoga County, New York, a village
Victory, Minneapolis, Minnesota, neighborhood
Victory, Oklahoma, an unincorporated community
Victory, Vermont, a town
Victory, Wisconsin, an unincorporated community
Victory Boulevard (Staten Island)
Victory Boulevard (Los Angeles)
Mount Victory, Ohio, a village

Elsewhere
Rural Municipality of Victory No. 226, Saskatchewan, Canada
Victory Beach, New Zealand
Victory (volcano), a volcano on New Guinea island, Papua New Guinea
Mount Victory (Papua New Guinea), the same volcano
 Victory (crater), a crater in Taurus–Littrow valley on the Moon

Companies
Victory Brewing Company in Downingtown, Pennsylvania
Victory Liner, the bus company in the Philippines
Victory Motorcycles, an American motorcycle manufacturer
Victory Records, an American record label

Ships
HMS Victory, six Royal Navy ships, as well as various shore establishments by that name
USS Victory (1863), a United States Navy gunboat
 Victory (1847 ship), a barque that took immigrants to New Zealand and Australia from 1848 to 1863
Victory ship, a type of naval vessel built by the United States during World War II
Carnival Victory, a cruise ship operated by Carnival Cruise Line
Victory, an 1828 paddlesteamer used by John Ross

Arts and entertainment

Films
Victory (1919 film), an American silent film
Victory (1928 film), a British film
Victory (1938 film), a Soviet film
Victory (1940 film), based on the novel by Joseph Conrad
Escape to Victory or Victory, a 1981 film directed by John Huston
Victory (1996 film), starring Willem Dafoe
Victory (2008 film), a Telugu film directed by Ravi
Victory (2009 film), a Bollywood film
Victory (2013 film), a Kannada film directed by Nanda Kishore

Television
"Victory" (Beast Wars), a 1996 episode of Beast Wars
Team Victory, a fictional group in Total Drama World Tour
Transformers Victory, the third Japanese transformers TV series

Music
Victory (band), a German heavy metal band

Albums
Victory (Bethel Music album), 2019
Victory (DJ Khaled album), 2010
Victory (Do or Die album), 2000
Victory (Jedward album), 2011
Victory (The Jacksons album), 1984
Victory (Modern Talking album), 2002
Victory (Narada Michael Walden album), 1980
Victory (Running Wild album), 2000
Victory (Unleashed album), 1995
Victory (EP), a 2015 extended play by San Holo

Songs
"Victory" (Yolanda Adams song), 2005
"Victory" (Bond song), 2000
"Victory" (Two Steps from Hell song), 2015
"Victory" (Megadeth song), 1994
"Victory" (Puff Daddy song), 1997
"Victory" (Pennsylvania State University fight song)
"Victory" (University of Dayton fight song)
"Victory", by Battle Beast from Steel
"Victory", by Dropkick Murphys, a bagpipe cover of the Notre Dame Victory March
"Victory", by Janelle Monáe from The Electric Lady
"Victory", by John Distin
"Victory", by Kool & the Gang from Forever
"Victory", by PJ Harvey from Dry
"Victory", by Riot V from Armor of Light
"Victory", by Simon Curtis from 8Bit Heart
"Victory", by Soprano from the EA Sports game FIFA 09
"Victory", by Sugababes from The Lost Tapes
"Victory", by Within the Ruins from Creature
"Victory Egg", originally "Victory", by Cardiacs from A Little Man and a House and the Whole World Window

Other
Victory (novel), a 1915 novel by Joseph Conrad
Victory, a 1998 novel by Kristine Kathryn Rusch
Victory, a comic book series by Image Comics
Victory (pinball), a 1987 pinball machine by Premier
Victory, part of the 1902 statue group William Tecumseh Sherman (Saint-Gaudens), by Augustus Saint-Gaudens

Theaters
National Theatre, Melbourne, in Melbourne, Australia, which opened in 1920 as the Victory Theatre 
Victory Theatre, a theater in Evansville, Indiana
Victory Theater, a theater in Holyoke, Massachusetts
Victoria Theatre (Dayton, Ohio), which re-opened in 1919 as the Victory Theatre

Sports teams
California Victory, a USL professional football team in San Francisco, California
Melbourne Victory FC, an Australian professional football club
Victory SC, a Haitian football club
Victory Sports Club, a Maldivian football club
Victory Team, a powerboat racing team from the United Arab Emirates

People
Victory (surname)
Jack Victory, ring name of American professional wrestler Kenneth Rinehurst
Vicky Victory, ring name of American female professional wrestler Peach Janae from the Gorgeous Ladies of Wrestling

Other uses
Victory (church), an Evangelical church based in the Philippines
Victory Museum, a museum in Afyonkarahisar, Turkey
Victory (political party), a political party in Guatemala
Victory station, a mass transit station in Dallas, Texas

See also

 
 Al-Fath (“Victory”), the forty-eighth sura of the Qur'an
 Victorious (disambiguation)